The 1995 NCAA Division I Men's Basketball Championship Game was the finals of the 1995 NCAA Division I men's basketball tournament and it determined the national champion for the 1994-95 NCAA Division I men's basketball season  The 1995 National Title Game was played on April 3, 1995 at the Kingdome in Seattle, Washington. The 1995 National Title Game was played between the 1995 West Regional Champions, #1-seeded UCLA and the 1995 Midwest Regional Champions and defending National Champions, #2-seeded Arkansas.

This was the last national championship game that was played in a western state until the 2017 National Title Game which was played at the University of Phoenix Stadium in Glendale, Arizona due to the NCAA's preference for domed stadiums as well as the last Final Four in Seattle, a city which had hosted the event 4 times previously. Additionally this was the last time for the foreseeable future the Pacific Northwest hosted a Final Four or Regional Final after playing host to the aforementioned 4 in Seattle along with 1 in Portland.

Participating teams

Arkansas

Midwest
(2) Arkansas 79, (15) Texas Southern 78
Arkansas 96, (7) Syracuse 94 (OT)
Arkansas 96, (6) Memphis 91 (OT)
Arkansas 68, (4) Virginia 61
Final Four
Arkansas 75, (2) North Carolina 68

UCLA

Midwest
UCLA (1) 92, Florida International (16) 56
UCLA 75, Missouri (8) 74
UCLA 86, Mississippi State (5) 67
UCLA 102, Connecticut (2) 96
Final Four
UCLA 74, Oklahoma State (4) 61

Starting lineups

Game summary

Game notes
 Ed O'Bannon scored 30 points and grabbed 17 rebounds and is named the tournament's Most Outstanding Player as the Bruins win the championship 89–78 over Arkansas. 
 Cameron Dollar played 36 minutes and contributed eight assists and four steals while filling in for an injured Edney, who did not return after leaving with 17:23 left in the first half. 
 The Bruins enjoyed the biggest lead 34–26 in the first half, but led only by a point at halftime 40–39.

References

NCAA Division I Men's Basketball Championship Game
NCAA Division I Men's Basketball Championship Games
Arkansas Razorbacks men's basketball
UCLA Bruins men's basketball
College sports tournaments in Washington (state)
Basketball competitions in Seattle
NCAA Division I Men's Basketball Championship Game
NCAA Division I Men's Basketball Championship Game
NCAA Division I Basketball Championship Game